Sunshine Girl or Sunshine Girls may refer to:
 Sunshine Girl, the pinup section in the Sun chain of newspapers in Canada
 "Sunshine Girl" (Herman's Hermits song), a 1968 song by the Herman's Hermits
 "Sunshine Girl" (Moumoon song), a 2010 song by the Japanese band Moumoon
 The Sunshine Girl, a 1912 West End musical comedy
 Günther (singer), who performed as Günther and the Sunshine Girls
 Jamaica national netball team, nicknamed the Sunshine Girls
 Tiller Girls, a dance troupe of the early 1900s
 Pythian Sunshine Girls, an auxiliary of the Knights of Pythias for young women
 The main character of The Haunting of Sunshine Girl.